The Flying U Ranch is a 1927 American silent Western film directed by Robert De Lacey and starring Tom Tyler, Nora Lane and Bert Hadley.

Cast
 Tom Tyler as Señor Miguel García 
 Nora Lane as Sally Denson 
 Bert Hadley as Chip Bennett 
 Grace Woods as The Little Doctor 
 Frankie Darro as Chip Jr 
 Olin Francis as Dunk Whitaker 
 Barney Furey as Pink 
 Dudley Hendricks as Weary 
 Bill Patton as Happy Jack

References

External links
 

1927 films
1927 Western (genre) films
Films directed by Robert De Lacey
American black-and-white films
Film Booking Offices of America films
Silent American Western (genre) films
1920s English-language films
1920s American films